Mazraleh (also Romanized as Mazrāleh; also known as Mazr Ālā) is a village in Satar Rural District, Kolyai District, Sonqor County, Kermanshah Province, Iran. At the 2006 census, its population was 117, in 27 families.

References 

Populated places in Sonqor County